16 Biggest Hits is a 2007 Alabama compilation album. It is part of a series of similar 16 Biggest Hits albums released by Legacy Recordings.   It has sold 384,000 copies in the US as of May 2013.

Track listing

Chart performance
16 Biggest Hits peaked at #40 on the U.S. Billboard Top Country Albums chart the week of August 16, 2008.

Certifications

References

Alabama
Alabama (band) compilation albums
2007 greatest hits albums